Nesogobius is a genus of goby native to the coastal waters of Australia.

Species
There are currently 5 recognized species in this genus:
 Nesogobius greeni Hoese & Larson, 2006
 Nesogobius hinsbyi (McCulloch & J. D. Ogilby, 1919) (Tasmanian orange-spotted sandgoby)
 Nesogobius maccullochi Hoese & Larson, 2006
 Nesogobius pulchellus (Castelnau, 1872) (Australian sailfingoby)
 Nesogobius tigrinus M. P. Hammer, Hoese & Bertozzi, 2015 (Tiger sandgoby)

References

Gobiidae
Taxa named by Gilbert Percy Whitley
Marine fish genera